The black-striped skink (Brachyseps macrocercus) is a species of skink endemic to Madagascar.

References

Reptiles of Madagascar
Reptiles described in 1882
Brachyseps
Taxa named by Albert Günther